"Paris" is a song by American electronic music duo the Chainsmokers, featuring uncredited vocals from American singer-songwriter and frequent collaborator Emily Warren. "Paris" was released on January 13, 2017, as the lead single from their debut album, Memories...Do Not Open, through Disruptor Records and Columbia Records. It was served to Top 40 radio on January 17, 2017, as the follow-up radio single to "Closer".

It reached the top 10 on the US Billboard Hot 100. The single became the duo's fourth number one on the Billboard Dance/Mix Show Airplay chart in its issue dated February 25, 2017, and their fifth number one on the magazine's Dance/Electronic Songs chart in its issue dated March 11, 2017.

Background
In an interview with Billboards Taylor Weatherby, Warren said about the collaboration:

She was also asked about why she wasn't credited on the song, to which she replied,

Critical reception
Nolan Feeney of Entertainment Weekly gave it a B rating, saying "The track itself makes similar alterations to the band's sound without straying too far from the formula: You'll find the familiar chilled-out keyboards of 'Closer', a guitar loop like the one in 'Don't Let Me Down', and more lyrics about nostalgia and youth and living wild and free, but there's no real drop, and the synths that kick in at the end are relatively subtle. On paper, that all sounds like a bid to showcase some stripped-down musicianship, and The Chainsmokers have certainly earned the right to do so: anyone who thinks they're just DJs who twist knobs just hasn't been paying attention. But in the end, 'Paris' feels like the demo of a song that wants to take more risks than it actually does." 

Idolator's Carl Williott claimed "it's a subdued piece of EDM-pop, relying more on guitars than synths, but it's still that signature 'smokers MOR sound", and also stated "the song is about Paris, but the visual takes place on a beach with a supermodel because nothing makes sense in 2017." 

Raisa Bruner of Time labeled it "a less-than-encouraging reflection on yet another tricky relationship" and went on to say "this seems to be The Chainsmokers' sweet spot: slow-burning tunes—this one is especially down-tempo—with tropical house undercurrents, a little bit of nostalgic story, and an emotionally ambiguous core." 

USA Todays Patrick Ryan stated, "the low-key banger is a nostalgic ode to the City of Lights, painting a schmaltzy picture of millennial romance that's marked by cigarette drags and disheveled hotel rooms."

Chart performance
"Paris" debuted on the US Billboard Hot 100 at number seven. In its second week, the song dropped to number 11 but it bounced back to the top 10 in its February 25, 2017 issue. The song peaked at number six on the US Billboard Hot 100, becoming the duo's fourth top 10 entry. On the Canadian Hot 100 it debuted at number two behind Ed Sheeran's "Shape of You".

Music video
A lyric video for "Paris" was released on January 12, 2017. It was edited and directed by Rory Kramer and shows an unknown man who is holding the camera filming the journey through a tropical country together with a young girl who is played by Alexis Ren.

The official music video for "Paris" was released on February 16, 2017. It features the duo (Drew Taggart and Alex Pall) walking, intercut with shots of them and American model Martha Hunt, who stars in the video, in a house that begins floating and rising up into the sky, with the duo watching from the ground. Towards the end of the show, Hunt slides out of the window of the floating house and somehow falls back down into the same house from which she fell.

Usage in media
The song is also used as a background music for the Renault Samsung SM6 commercial for the South Korean market.

Live performance
On March 5, 2017, The Chainsmokers performed "Paris" at the iHeartRadio Music Awards at The Forum in Inglewood, California, which was then followed by a performance of "Something Just Like This" featuring Chris Martin from Coldplay. The song was also performed during The Chainsmokers' appearance on Saturday Night Live as musical guest on April 8, 2017.

Track listing

Charts

Weekly charts

Year-end charts

Certifications

Release history

References

2017 singles
2017 songs
The Chainsmokers songs
Disruptor Records singles
Emily Warren songs
Songs about Paris
Song recordings produced by the Chainsmokers
Songs written by Andrew Taggart
Songs written by Fredrik Häggstam